HD 45184 is a star in the southern constellation of Canis Major. It is a yellow-hued star near the lower limit of visibility to the naked eye with an apparent visual magnitude of 6.37. The star is located at a distance of 71.65 light years from the Sun based on parallax. It is drifting closer with a radial velocity of −3.8 km/s.

This object is an ordinary G-type main-sequence star with a stellar classification of G2Va, and it is considered a solar twin. The mass, size, and luminosity of the star are slightly higher than for the Sun, and it has a near solar metallicity – what astronomers term the abundance of elements with higher atomic numbers than helium. The star is around three billion years old and is spinning with a 20-day period. It has a 5.14-year magnetic activity cycle that has a lower amplitude than on the Sun.

Planetary system
HD 45184 has a planet around 12 times as massive as Earth that takes 5.88 days to complete an orbit around its host star. This planet was detected using the radial velocity method. It was later confirmed with Spitzer, whereupon a second candidate planet of similar mass was discovered orbiting with a 13.1 day period. The star was observed by Spitzer for a transit of the inner planet, but no event was detected. Both Neptune-like planets have near circular orbits close to the host star.

References 

G-type main-sequence stars
Solar twins
Circumstellar disks
Planetary systems with two confirmed planets

Canis Major
Durchmusterung objects
Gliese and GJ objects
045184
030503
2318